The Heights is an American musical drama series that aired Thursday at 9:00 pm on Fox from August 27 to November 26, 1992.

Synopsis
The Heights centered on a fictional band (also called the Heights) made up of mostly working-class young adults. Episodes regularly featured one of their songs.

The eventual theme song for the show, "How Do You Talk to an Angel" (sung by cast member Jamie Walters), went to number one on the Billboard Hot 100 chart, and was the first song from a television show to top the Hot 100 since 1985, as well as the first song by a fictional band to top the Hot 100 since 1969. The Heights premiered on August 27, 1992, to low ratings, and never gained a substantial audience. Fox canceled the series less than a week after the theme song fell from the number one spot.

Cast
Jamie Walters as Alex O'Brien
Camille Saviola as Shelley Abramowitz
Alex Désert as Stan Lee
Charlotte Ross as Hope Linden
Zachary Throne as Lenny Wieckowski
Donnelly Rhodes as Harry Abramowitz
Jon Cuthbert as Sean McDougall
Shawn David Thompson as J.T. Banks
Cheryl Pollak as Rita MacDougal
Tasia Valenza as Jodie Abramowitz
Ray Aranha as Mr. Mike
Ken Garito as Arthur "Dizzy" Mazelli

Episodes

Awards and nominations

See also
 Catwalk, a 1992–94 TV series about a fictional band, with several of the same songwriters called the Heights.
 The Monkees, a 1966–68 comedy television series about a band who achieved huge success in real life.
 California Dreams, a 1992-96 Saturday morning series about a fictional band which also had music by Steve Tyrell and which used Heights theme co-writer Barry Coffing and cast member Zachary Thorne as singing voices for two of the characters.

References

External links
 

1992 American television series debuts
1992 American television series endings
1990s American drama television series
1990s American music television series
English-language television shows
Fictional musical groups
Fox Broadcasting Company original programming
Television series about fictional musicians
Television series by CBS Studios
Television series by Spelling Television
Television shows set in New York City